Hyung-joon, also spelled Hyung-jun or Hyong-jun, is a Korean masculine given name. Its meaning differs based on the hanja used to write each syllable of the name.

Hanja
Regulations of the Supreme Court of Korea permit the following hanja to be registered for use in names:

Hyung (25 hanja):  
Joon (44 hanja):

People
Jonathan Kim (born Kim Hyung-joon, 1960), South Korean film producer
Park Heong-joon (born 1960), South Korean politician
Kim Hyeong-jun (born 1968), South Korean film director
Im Hyung-joon (born 1974), South Korean actor
Kim Joon (born Kim Hyung-joon, 1984), South Korean actor, rapper and singer
Hangzoo (born Yoon Hyung-joon, 1986), South Korean rapper, member of Rhythm Power
Kim Hyung-jun (born 1987), South Korean actor and singer, member of SS501
Joo Hyong-jun (born 1991), South Korean speed skater

Fictional characters
Kang Hyung-joon, in 2012 South Korean television series Missing You
Lee Hyung-joon, in 2013 South Korean television series Who Are You?

See also
List of Korean given names
Park Hyung-jun (born 1983), South Korean triple jumper

References

Korean masculine given names